The Deerness Valley Railway was an 8-mile long single track branch railway line that ran along the valley of the River Deerness in County Durham, England.

History
The line was primarily built to serve the collieries at Ushaw Moor, Waterhouses, Hamsteels, Esh, Cornsay, New Brancepeth and East Hedley Hope, and was opened to passengers only as an afterthought.

Opening
Authorised in 1855, the line opened to goods on New Year's Day 1858, but it was not until 1 November 1877 that the first passenger station, Waterhouses near Esh Winning, was opened.

Industries served
Beyond the East Hedley Hope junction, the line was known as Stockton and Darlington Railway Deerness Valley Branch, with the rope worked Stanley Inclines giving access to Stanley Drifts and Wooley Colliery. This section was built for Joseph Pease and Partners, the owners of Waterhouses Colliery who also owned the industrial complex at Bank Foot.

Closure
The entire line closed to passengers on 29 October 1951, and to freight on 28 December 1964.

The site today
The trackbed became part of the Durham Railway Paths network in 1975.

References

External links
Waterhouses station on Disused Stations with line history
Photos of the line in operation on Ushaw Moor Historical Website
Deerness Valley Railway Path
Line on a 1948 OS Map

Closed railway lines in North East England
Rail transport in County Durham
Railway lines opened in 1855
Railway lines closed in 1964
Rail trails in England